Kim Hyun-jung (born February 10, 1990), better known by the stage name Hoody, is a South Korean singer-songwriter. She debuted in 2013 as a member of the all-female underground hip hop crew Amourette. In 2015, she became the first female artist to sign to the hip hop record label AOMG.

Discography

Studio albums

Extended plays

Singles

References

External links

Living people
1990 births
21st-century South Korean women singers
Women hip hop musicians
South Korean women singer-songwriters
South Korean hip hop singers